Ibrahim Khan may refer to:

 Ibrahim Khan II (reigned 1689–1697), the last Subahdar of Bengal during the reign of emperor Aurangzeb
 Ibrahim Khan Gardi (died 1761), Dakhani Muslim general in the 18th century India
 Ibrahim Khan Fath-i-Jang (reigned 1617–1624), Subahdar of Bengal during the reign of emperor Jahangir
 Ibrahim Khan (writer) (c. 1894–1978), Bangladeshi politician and academic
 Ibrahim Khan (Indian cricketer) (1911–1977), Indian cricketer
 Ibrahim Khan (Pakistani cricketer) (born 1964), Pakistani cricketer
 Ibrahim Khan (politician), Pakistani politician
 Muhammad Ibrahim Khan (politician) (1915–2003), Azad Kashmir politician
 Obby Khan (born 1980), former Canadian football centre
 Ibrahim Khalil Khan (1730–1806), Azeri Turkic khan of Karabakh